Cristofoli is an Italian surname. Notable people with the surname include:

 Ed Cristofoli (born 1967), Canadian ice hockey player
 Nada Cristofoli (born 1971), Italian cyclist

See also
 Cristofali
 Cristofori (disambiguation)

Italian-language surnames
Patronymic surnames